This is a list of computer programs for BeOS.

 Adam - e-mail client
 AudioElements - audio editor
 Army Knife - audio attribute editor
 Becasso - photo editor/paint program
 Beezer - file archival/compression application
 BeKaffe - Java virtual machine
 BePDF - PDF reader
 BeServed - Network file system
 BeShare - file-sharing application
 CL-Amp - audio player
 Eddie - text editor
 Gobe Productive - office suite
 ImageElements - image editor/manipulator
 ObjektSynth - modular software synth
 personalStudio - video editor
 Pe - text editor
 Rack747 - synthesizer/sequencer/drum-machine
 SoundPlay - audio player
 TV-O-Rama - DVB application
 TimeTracker - scheduled recording software
 TuneBridge - music database builder
 TunePrepper - music ripping and prepping software
 TuneStacker - professional program log generation software
 TuneTracker Basic - commercial radio automation software
 TuneTracker Command Center - advanced commercial radio automation software
 Vision - IRC client

BeOS is bundled with these programs:

 3dmiX - sound mix
 BeMail - e-mail client
 Camera - digital camera picture manager
 CDBurner
 CDPlayer
 Clock
 CodyCam - interface for video cameras
 DiskProbe
 Expander - compressed file expander
 Magnify
 MediaPlayer
 MidiPlayer
 NetPositive - web browser
 People - contact information manager
 PoorMan - web server
 Pulse - CPU monitor
 SCSIProbe
 SerialConnect - serial debugger
 ShowImage - image viewer
 SoftwareValet - software package manager
 SoundRecorder
 StyledEdit - text editor
 Terminal
 TV - TV card interface
 Chart
 FontDemo
 GLTeapot - OpenGL Demo
 Minesweeper

In addition, many cross platform programs have or had BeOS ports:

 AbiWord - word processor
 Basilisk II - Macintosh emulator
 Blender 3D
 Civilization: Call to Power
 CodeWarrior (as BeIDE)
 Doom - classic first-person shooter
 Free Pascal - A modern open source Object Pascal compiler
 Harbour - A modern, multi-platform, open source Clipper-compatible compiler
 Macromedia Flash Player
 Mozilla Firefox, Mozilla Thunderbird, Nvu
 NetSurf - Web browser
 Netwide Assembler (NASM)
 Opera
 Otter Browser
 p7zip - compression utility
 PearPC - Macintosh emulator
 Pforth - Forth language compiler
 Quake, Quake II, and Quake III Arena
 QupZilla
 RealPlayer G2 - media player
 SeaMonkey - Internet application suite
 SheepShaver - Mac OS runtime environment
 SkyORB - space simulation utility
 Spellswell - spelling checker
 Transmission
 VLC media player
 VNC - Virtual Network Computing
 Xitami - web server

As well as many command line tools, SDL games, and some X11 applications.

BeOS
BeOS programs